Art Rochester (born February 25, 1944) is an American sound engineer. He has been nominated for five Academy Awards in the category Best Sound. He worked on more than 60 films from 1970 to 2008.

Selected filmography
 The Conversation (1974)
 The Witches of Eastwick (1987)
 Clear and Present Danger (1994)
 Con Air (1997)
 Master and Commander: The Far Side of the World (2003)

References

External links

1944 births
Living people
American audio engineers
Best Sound BAFTA Award winners
Engineers from California
People from Los Angeles